Communal elections were held in Burundi on 3 June and 7 June 2005. The elections were won by the National Council for the Defense of Democracy – Forces for the Defense of Democracy (CNDD-FDD), which won 1,781 of the 3,225 seats.

Electoral system
Each of the 129 communes had 25 seats.

Conduct
The election was largely peaceful in most parts of the country, however, violence and intimidation in some communes of Bujumbura Rural and Bubanza provinces led to a re-poll held on 7 June. Observers considered the communal elections generally free and fair, despite some minor irregularities.

Results

References

Elections in Burundi
Burundi
Elections, communal